Denmark took 10 athletes to the 1978 European Athletics Championships which took place 29 August–3 September 1978 in Prague. Denmark won no medals at the Championships.

References 

Nations at the 2014 European Athletics Championships
1978
1978 in Danish sport